St. Anastasia Island (ostrov Sv. Anastasiya, formerly called Bolshevik Island, остров Болшевик) is a small Bulgarian island in the Black Sea. It is located in the Gulf of Burgas, 1.5 km off the coast near Chernomorets, at 12 metres above sea level, and covers a territory of one hectare. The island is built of volcanic rocks. It is the only inhabited island off the Bulgarian Black Sea Coast.

The island is supplied with electricity and drinking water. It is named after the former St. Anastasia convent located on it. The convent had existed since the Middle Ages and was reconstructed during the 18th-19th century. It has been abandoned since 1923, when the island was transformed into a prison.

In 1925, a group of 43 political prisoners (communists and anti-fascists), led by Teohar Bakardzhiev, revolted and escaped from the island, subsequently fleeing to the Soviet Union. In their honor, the island was renamed Bolshevik Island when the communists came into power in 1945. Bulgarian film director Rangel Valchanov based his 1958 film On The Small Island on this event.

A Bulgarian Burgas-based weekly newspaper, Factor, reported in 2006 that the Movement for Rights and Freedoms leader, Ahmed Dogan, visited the island and expressed desire to privatize it. The Bulgarian Orthodox Church, however, which claims the island is its property, objected.

Today, in addition to the monastery with its church, there is a lighthouse situated on the island, as well as a museum, a restaurant, a small quay, a conference hall and two guesthouses with a total of five rooms available to tourists. In the summer, the island is accessible from Burgas via boat services running back and forth multiple times a day.

Gallery

External links
 Official tourism website of the island

See also
 List of islands of Bulgaria
 St. Ivan Island
 St. Cyricus Island

References

Islands of Bulgaria
Islands of the Black Sea
Bulgarian Black Sea Coast
Landforms of Burgas Province
Tourist attractions in Burgas Province